The New Celebrity Apprentice (also known simply as The Apprentice) was the eighth and final installment of the reality game show The Celebrity Apprentice, thus making it the fifteenth and final installment of The Apprentice as a whole. It aired from January 2 to February 13, 2017. The winner of this season was Matt Iseman.

The season marked the only appearance of Arnold Schwarzenegger, actor and former Governor of California, as host. The show's previous and original host, Donald Trump, stated he opted to leave "out of respect" while he was focusing on his presidential campaign. NBC had also begun to cut ties with Trump following controversial remarks he made upon the start of his campaign in 2015. Trump remained as an executive producer through the show's production company, MGM Television.

NBC announced the 16 contestants, as well as advisors Warren Buffett, Tyra Banks, Steve Ballmer, Jessica Alba, and Patrick M. Knapp Schwarzenegger, on January 28, 2016. On December 1, 2016, six more advisors were announced. Those advisers were former The Apprentice winner Leeza Gibbons, celebrity chef Rocco DiSpirito, Extra co-host Tracey Edmonds, The Biggest Loser host Bob Harper, YouTube star iJustine, and "Moola" CEO Gemma Godfrey. The season was filmed in Los Angeles.

Along with the change of host and location, the catch phrase that accompanied a candidate's termination was changed from "You're fired" to "You're terminated", a reference to one of Schwarzenegger's most famous film roles. Also, instead of sending contestants away in a taxi cab or limousine, Schwarzenegger would send them away with a helicopter, telling them to "get to the chopper", a reference to the film Predator.

On March 3, 2017, Schwarzenegger announced he would leave the show after one season, since he did not like the "baggage" attached to the show caused by Trump. On August 3, 2017, NBC announced that the show had been cancelled outright.

Candidates
The cast was announced on January 28, 2016.

Weekly results

 The candidate was on the winning team.
 The candidate was on the losing team.
 The candidate won the competition and was named the Celebrity Apprentice
 The candidate won as project manager on his/her team.
 The candidate lost as project manager on his/her team.
 The candidate was on the losing team and brought to the final boardroom.
 The candidate was terminated.
 The candidate lost as project manager and was terminated.
 The candidate was disqualified from the competition for breaking the rules.
 The candidate was excused from the task but not terminated.

Episodes

Reception

The season received an overwhelmingly negative response and President Donald Trump mocked Arnold Schwarzenegger multiple times regarding the season's low ratings, saying he was a poor fit for the show and was not a good host compared to himself. Katz Television Group's Bill Carroll stated, "Arnold Schwarzenegger was fine, but it was a different dynamic. The Apprentice in the United States was Trump. From the opening credits—the Trump helicopter, the Trump plane, Trump buildings, it was so identified with Trump and his personality that it's difficult to recast."

References

External links 

15
The Apprentice (American TV series)
2017 American television seasons
Arnold Schwarzenegger
Television shows filmed in California
Television shows filmed in Nebraska